Windberg Abbey is a Premonstratensian monastery in Windberg in Lower Bavaria, Germany.

History

First foundation

Windberg Abbey was founded by Count Albert I of Bogen with the assistance of Bishop Otto of Bamberg on the site of the original seat of the Counts of Bogen. Initially it was not a specifically Premonstratensian foundation, but was transferred to the order as an already established community between 1121 and 1146. The choir of the church was dedicated on 21 and 22 May 1142 by Heinrich Zdik, Bishop of Olmütz, in the presence of Count Albert. Duke Vladislav II of Bohemia secured the endowment of the monastery by granting it the properties of Schüttenhofen (now Sušice) and Albrechtsried.

The foundation was dedicated in honour of the Virgin Mary and in 1146 raised to the status of an abbey. After the extension of the abbey church it was dedicated on 28 November 1167 by the Premonstratensian abbot of Leitomischl (now Litomyšl) and Johannes IV, bishop of Olmütz.

The abbey was secularised and dissolved during the secularisation of Bavaria in 1803. The church became a parish church and the abbot's house the residence of the parish clergy. The monastic buildings passed into private ownership, and from 1835 were used for a brewery.

Second foundation
In 1923 the monastic community was re-established here by Premonstratensians from Berne-Heeswijk Abbey in the Netherlands. As of 2005, 33 Premonstratensian canons live in Windberg.

Roggenburg Priory near Neu-Ulm is a priory of Windberg Abbey.

In around 1955, the then abbot, Fr. Norbert Backmund, visited Beeleigh Abbey near Maldon in Essex, England, and was hosted by its owner Mr William Foyle, founder and owner of Foyles Bookshop. Beeleigh Abbey had been a Premonstratensian abbey founded in 1180 and dissolved by Henry VIII in 1536. This was the first visit to Beeleigh Abbey by a Premonstratensian abbot since the Dissolution of the Monasteries.

The abbey church
The church is a three-aisled basilica with transept. It mostly originates from the 12th century and shows the influence of Hirsau Abbey. The monumental chief portal is especially impressive; the north portal is somewhat simpler. The tower, built in the 13th century, received its present form  as recently as 1750 - 1760.

The Baroque high altar was made between 1735 and 1740, and contains a statue of the Virgin from about 1650. The pulpit dates from 1674. The stucco work in the church interior was created by Mathias Obermayr, who also made the four extremely detailed side-altars, two of which are dated 1756.

Sources and references 
 Prämonstratenser-Abtei Windberg, 
 Die Kunstdenkmäler von Niederbayern, vol. XX: Bezirksamt Bogen, p. 440. Munich, 1929
 Backmund, Norbert, 1966. Die Chorherrenorden und ihre Stifte in Bayern. Augustinerchorherren, Prämonstratenser, Chorherren v. Hl. Geist, Antoniter. Mit einem Beitrag von Adalbert Mischlewski: Die Niederlassungen des Antoniterordens in Bayern, p. 2. Passau.

External links 
  Abtei Windberg: official website
  Klöster in Bayern

Premonstratensian monasteries in Germany
Monasteries in Bavaria
1140s establishments in the Holy Roman Empire
1142 establishments in Europe
Christian monasteries established in the 12th century
1803 disestablishments in Europe
Christian organizations established in 1923
12th-century establishments in the Holy Roman Empire
Straubing-Bogen